Abdol-Ali Mirza Farman Farmaian (1935–1973) was an Iranian businessman and nobleman. He was the youngest son of the Qajar Persian nobleman Abdol-Hossein Farman Farma and his wife Batoul Khanoum.

Abdol-Ali Mirza Farman Farmaian was born on January 6, 1935. He studied at Oxford University in England, earning a degree in business. Upon returning to Iran, he became involved in several industrial projects, including the co-founding (with his brother Cyrus) of the Naft-e Pars Pars Oil Company, which became Iran's largest private petrochemical factory. Prince Abdol Ali Farman Farmaian died in an avalanche while skiing at the Dizin Resort near Tehran February 2, 1973, leaving his daughter Mariam and his two sons Salman and Abu-Ali.

He also co-founded the Chamber of Industries.

See also
 Persia
 History of Persia
 History of Iran
 Qajar dynasty of Iran

References

Daughter of Persia; Sattareh Farman Farmaian with Dona Munker; Crown Publishers,Inc., New York (1992)
Blood and Oil: Memoirs of a Persian Prince; Manucher Mirza Farman Farmaian. Random House, New York (1997)

External links
The Qajar (Kadjar) Pages
Qajars Dynasty Turkoman dynasty of the Shahs of Persia

1932 births
1973 deaths
Qajar princes
Farmanfarmaian family